The State Energy Commission of Western Australia was an Australian energy provider. It was established on 1 January 1975 as an amalgamation of the State Electricity Commission of Western Australia (established 1945) plus the Fuel and Power Commission.

It was involved in the buying of the Fremantle Gas and Coke Company as part of the WA Inc events.

On 1 January 1995 it was split up into separate gas and electricity utilities, named AlintaGas and Western Power Corporation respectively.

References

External links
 Australian Science at Work - State Electricity Commission of Western Australia (1945 - 1975)
 Australian Science at Work - State Energy Commission of Western Australia (1975 - 1995)

Defunct utility companies of Western Australia
Energy in Western Australia
Defunct government agencies of Western Australia
Natural gas companies of Australia
Electric power companies of Australia